In dynamical systems theory, the Liouville–Arnold theorem states that if, in a Hamiltonian dynamical system with n degrees of freedom, there are also  n independent,
Poisson commuting first integrals of motion, and the energy level set is compact, then there exists a canonical transformation to action-angle coordinates in which the transformed Hamiltonian is dependent only upon the action coordinates and the angle coordinates evolve linearly in time. Thus the equations of motion for the system can be solved in quadratures if the level simultaneous set conditions can be separated. The theorem is named after Joseph Liouville and Vladimir Arnold.

History 
It was generalized to the setting of symplectic manifolds by Arnol'd, who gave a proof in his textbook Mathematical Methods of Classical Mechanics published 1974.

Statement

Preliminary definitions 
Let  be a -dimensional symplectic manifold with symplectic structure .

 (Generic) linear independence:  on a dense set
 Mutually Poisson commuting: the Poisson bracket  vanishes for any pair of values . 
The Poisson bracket is the Lie bracket of vector fields of the Hamiltonian vector field corresponding to each .

A point  is a regular point if .

The integrable system defines a function . Denote by  the level set of the functions ,

or alternatively, .

Now if  is given the additional structure of a distinguished function , the Hamiltonian system  is integrable if  can be completed to an integrable system, that is, there exists an integrable system .

Theorem 
 If  is furthermore compact and connected, it is diffeomorphic to the N-torus .
These coordinates are called action-angle coordinates.

Examples of Liouville-integrable systems 
A Hamiltonian system which is integrable is referred to as 'integrable in the Liouville sense' or 'Liouville-integrable'. Famous examples are given in this section.

Some notation is standard in the literature. Unless otherwise stated, these are assumed for this section.

 Integrable tops: The Lagrange, Euler and Kovalevskaya tops are integrable in the Liouville sense.

See also 
 Frobenius integrability: a more general notion of integrability.
 Integrable systems

References 

Hamiltonian mechanics
Integrable systems
Theorems in dynamical systems